Mihail Aleksandrov and Mihail Alexandrov may refer to:

Mihail Aleksandrov, a Bulgarian footballer
Mihail Alexandrov, an Olympic swimmer from Bulgaria